Armley is a district in the west of Leeds, West Yorkshire, England. Like much of Leeds, Armley grew in the Industrial Revolution and had several mills, one of which houses now the Leeds Industrial Museum at Armley Mills. Armley is predominantly and historically a largely working class area of the city, still retains many smaller industrial businesses, and has many rows of back-to-back terraced houses.

It sits in the Armley ward of Leeds City Council and Leeds West parliamentary constituency.

In 2022, statistics released by West Yorkshire Police revealed Armley and New Wortley had the second highest crime rate in Leeds after Leeds city centre.

Etymology
First attested in the Domesday Book of 1086 as Ermelai, the name Armley comes from Old English. The second element is from Old English lēah ('open space in a wood'). The origin of the first element is less clear, but thought to come from an otherwise unattested Old English name Earma, a plausible nickname form of the name Earnmund. If so, the name originally meant 'Earma's woodland clearing'.

Historically lying within the township of Armley, to the south of Armley's centre, the district of Green Side is first mentioned by this name in the nineteenth century. The origin of the name is not certain, but is probably named after the green space now constituted as Wortley Recreation Ground and Western Flatts Cliff park.

History 

Armley is mentioned in the 1086 Domesday Book reference to "Ristone, Ermelai". At the time there were eight villagers in Ristone (now east Armley) and Ermelai (now west Armley). Armley was recorded as lying within the hundred of Morley and was estimated to comprise only four households, placing it in the bottom fifth of settlements in the Domesday Book by population size. The actual population is indeterminable as this only accounts for the 'head of household'.

Armley Mills, now the Leeds Industrial Museum at Armley Mills, was the world's largest woollen mill when it was built in 1788. In the 18th and 19th centuries Armley was, through its mills, a major contributor to the economy of the city of Leeds. Many of the buildings standing in and around Armley were built in the 1800s, including many of the churches, schools, shops and houses. Ledgard Way is named after the entrepreneur Samuel Ledgard. Armley also has picturesque views over the rest of Leeds from certain vantage points. William Tetley started his business of malters in Armley in the 1740s. His grandson Joshua Tetley founded Tetley's Brewery in Hunslet in 1822.

Damage caused by a raid in the Leeds Blitz in March 1941 and later slum clearance schemes brought about the redevelopment of much of Armley in a programme beginning in the 1950s and finishing in the early 1970s.

From the 1870s until 1956, Armley was home to the J W Roberts asbestos mattress and boiler lining factory. This facility exposed residents to asbestos fibres and resulted in a mesothelioma cancer cluster which persists to this day. One of the victims, June Hancock, launched a court action against Turner & Newall, the company that owned the J W Roberts' factory in 1993. Although the court case was successful, corporate restructuring had, as of 2005, avoided the case being settled. Hancock's story was the subject of a play, Dust, by Kenneth F. Yates, performed in Armley and at the West Yorkshire Playhouse in July 2009.

The parish church, St Bartholomew's, is home to a notable pipe organ built by the German organ builder Edmund Schulze. Originally built for Meanwood Towers in 1866–69, it was opened by S. S. Wesley. It was moved to St Bartholomew's in 1879. Schulze's work, and this organ in particular, had enormous influence on the development of British organ building in the 19th century. Both church and organ have been restored. The smaller Christ Church is located at the end of Theaker Lane nearer the centre of Armley.

Legend has it that a pedlar called Charlie used to rest and water his pony and trap in Whingate Park in the 19th century. He apparently sold spicy shortbread to the citizens of Upper Armley for 1d a piece. Today the triangular-shaped park is known as Charlie or Charley Cake Park. According to Armley Through the Camera, written in 1901, the park was "within memory of many present residents of Armley, a patch of wasteland. Some of them regularly played cricket on its turf".

There were two railway stations in Armley. Armley Moor railway station on the line between Leeds and Bradford Exchange closed 1966, and Armley Canal Road railway station on the line between Leeds and Shipley closed 1965.

Geography
Armley is located between the M621 motorway and the River Aire, stretching from roughly the New Wortley roundabout (the Armley Gyratory) to the start of the Stanningley By-pass and Cockshott Lane where it merges into Bramley.

Amenities 
Armley Town Street includes high street names, charity shops and food and independent retailers. There are bus links to Leeds, Bradford, Pudsey and Whinmoor. Armley's Town Street has free off-road car parking, but parking is mainly on-street, with few car parks in the centre. Armley's only supermarket is a LIDL on Armley Road, but Aldi in neighbouring Wortley in a five-minute walk from Town Street, Wortley also has an Asda and Bramley has Tesco, Aldi, Morrisons and Farmfoods. Towards Farnley there is a Sainsbury's. The former Kwiksave store in Pudsey is now a branch of Sainsbury's; a previous Somerfield store is now the site of a Poundland.

Other amenities include Armley (Gott's) Park, Gott's Park Golf Club and Armley Mills Industrial Museum, and numerous former cinemas and churches. The old Methodist chapel is now a carpet outlet, like a similar chapel in Holbeck. There are present-day Methodist churches in Wesley Road, built in 1987, and in Whingate, built in 1884. The Wesley Road Chapel is a Local Ecumenical Partnership also involving the Baptist and United Reformed Churches.  The current church is the fourth on this site, where the original Methodist Wesleyan chapel stood and where John Wesley once preached.

Armley's original leisure centre, based on the old Armley swimming baths, was demolished in 2009. The land is now a large car park for the new leisure centre. The closure of the original 25-metre swimming pool with redundant and unused space attracted some controversy because of the age and local architectural significance of the building. The new centre has state-of-the-art equipment. Morley and Beeston will also receive new leisure centres under a programme being run by Leeds City Council.

HM Prison Leeds, formerly Armley Gaol is located in Armley.

Housing

Armley housing includes Victorian back-to-back houses, through terraces and tower blocks.

There is much council housing, although most of the housing stock is privately built and dates from the 1960s. Back-to-back housing has been converted to through terraces.

Corporation residential tower blocks, built to replace older housing stock at the centre of Armley, and neighbouring Wortley, are amongst the tallest in Leeds.

Notable people
Alfred Atkinson VC – born in Armley in 1874
Alan Bennett – playwright
Barbara Taylor Bradford – novelist
Diana Coupland – film and television actress and singer born and lived on Tennant Street, Armley.
William Boynton Butler VC, Croix de Guerre – born in Armley in 1894
Chumbawamba –  band; lived in Armley for some time
Benjamin Gott and William Gott – mill owners in Armley
Lily Elsie – actress born in Armley in 1886
Alice Nutter – writer and musician, who lived in Armley beginning in 1982
Geoff Gunney - professional rugby league footballer who played for Great Britain and Yorkshire and at club level for Hunslet.

Popular culture 
The tank scene in the 1963 film Billy Liar was filmed in Wellington Road, Armley, and local residents were used as extras.

Location grid

See also
Listed buildings in Leeds (Armley Ward)

References

Further reading
Kirkby T. (1901) Armley Through The Camera, Hanson & Oak, Theaker Lane, Armley, Leeds.

External links

Photographs of the Leeds & Liverpool Canal at Armley, Leeds
Leeds Industrial Museum at Armley Mills, Armley, Leeds

 
Places in Leeds